Nymphoides indica is an aquatic plant in the  Menyanthaceae, native to tropical areas around the world. It is sometimes cultivated, and has become a minor weed in Florida, where it resembles the native Nymphoides aquatica. Common names include banana plant, robust marshwort, and water snowflake; {In Bengali: চাঁদমালা (Chandmala)}.

Description
Nymphoides indica spreads by rhizomes, forming clusters of leaves, with clustered white flowers about 1 cm across. The flowers are sometimes described as having five petals, but can have more.

Voynich Manuscript
The Voynich Manuscript is a mysterious book written in code from Medieval times. It features various flora throughout the book. On page 6, a Nymphoides indica takes up most of the page.

References

External links

indica
Freshwater plants
Pantropical flora